Philip Côté (born 28 Dec, 1895 in Lawrence, Massachusetts) was an American clergyman and bishop for the Roman Catholic Diocese of Xuzhou. He became ordained in 1927. He was appointed bishop in 1935. He died in 1970.

References

20th-century Roman Catholic bishops in the United States
1895 births
1970 deaths
People from Lawrence, Massachusetts